Elizabeth Leonard could refer to:

Elizabeth D. Leonard, American historian
Elizabeth Weeks Leonard, American lawyer and academic
Elizabeth Leonard (politician), Republican candidate in the 1992 Rhode Island gubernatorial election

See also
Elizabeth Leonhardt, Chief Nurse of the U.S. Navy Nurse Corps